Habenaria obovata is a species of plant in the family Orchidaceae. It is endemic to Cameroon. Its natural habitat is subtropical or tropical dry lowland grassland.

References

obovata
Vulnerable plants
Endemic orchids of Cameroon
Taxonomy articles created by Polbot